Lake Sabbatia, sometimes known as Scaddings Pond is a 248-acre great pond in Taunton, Massachusetts, near Watson Pond State Park. The lake is where Mill River begins and the Snake River ends. It is the largest lake in the city of Taunton and the most popularly used. There are several coves and an island within the lake. Parts of its coastline are populated with woods, streets, and residential homes. Lake Sabbatia is used for a variety of recreational activities such as boating, swimming, fishing, and ice fishing. There is a boat ramp off Bay Street into the lake.

Various plants of the genus Sabbatia usually have pink cymose flowers and occur from acid bogs to brackish marshes. Sabbatia chloiroides grows in Plymouth county, on the margin of ponds; in July it has large, showy pink flowers. There is also a variety with white flowers.

Lake Sabbatia and Watson Pond are located entirely within the boundary of the state-designated Area of Critical Environmental Concern, the Canoe River Aquifer.

In April 2007 the residents of the Lake Sabbatia area formed a civic organization devoted to rebuilding the Morey's Bridge Dam at Bay Street. Morey's Bridge is the dam that regulates Lake Sabbatia water levels. The owner of the dam, faced with an order from the Massachusetts Department of Conservation and Recreation to repair or breach the dam, reached out to the local citizens to raise the necessary funds to construct a new dam. The dam owner would have been within his legal rights to dismantle the dam, thereby reducing the lake to a swampy marshland. He chose to match dollar for dollar all funds raised by the citizens. The citizens raised over $20,000 toward the construction of the new dam. Over 50 residents turned out to help build the dam, with local contractors donating heavy equipment, drivers, and materials. The spillway was designed to allow the lake to self regulate its water level, protecting the upstream habitats from draining and allowing fish to flourish. Future plans are to repair the original dam structure and incorporate a fish ladder.

See also 
Massasoit State Park
Taunton, Massachusetts
Taunton River

References

External links 
Yahoo Group for lake residents
Help Save Lake Sabbatia
City of Taunton's Home Page
City of Taunton's Water Department's Home Page
Massasoit State Park
Taunton River Watershed Alliance
Weakened dam threatens Massachusetts city - Reuters

Taunton, Massachusetts
Taunton River watershed
Reservoirs in Massachusetts
Sabbatia